Designed by ex Ferrari engineer Aurelio Lampredi, the Fiat Twin Cam (also known as the Lampredi Twin Cam) was an advanced inline-four automobile engine produced from 1966 through 2000 as a Fiat/Lancia engine until it was replaced by the "family B" Pratola Serra engine series. The Fiat Twin Cam engine has been widely used in motorsport and has been the most successful engine in the history of the World Rally Championship. Fiat and Lancia won a total of ten World Rally Championships for Manufacturers using engines based on the Lampredi Twin Cam engine.

Design
The engine uses the block of the OHV 124-series unit first found in the Fiat 124 with some modifications to accept the belt drive for the camshafts. The head itself is made in three pieces, one carrying the combustion chamber and valves and one separate casting for each camshaft in tunnel type bearings. The valves had an included angle of 65 degrees. The engine featured a revolutionary new method for adjusting the valve clearance. Usually at that time in DOHC engines like from Alfa Romeo or Jaguar, small shims were placed on the valve stem inside the bucket tappets, thereby necessitating the removal of the camshafts to get access to these shims to adjust the valve clearance, making for time consuming and very expensive maintenance work. Lampredi’s design placed the shims on top of the tappets where they could be removed with the camshaft in situ after the tappets were pressed down with a special tool. This design was patented for Fiat and was used in the engines of the 128 and 130, and even the Ferrari/Fiat Dino V6 engine was converted to this system.

Fiat was a pioneer in engine development during the time period, using belt driven camshafts and aluminium alloy heads. Earlier Fiat Twin Cam engines were actually O.S.C.A. designs.

Applications
Lampredi's twin cam engine was first seen in the Fiat 124 coupé of late 1966, but was later made available in a large number of cars.

Fiat

 1966-1974 124 Sport coupé
 1966-1985 124 Sport Spider
 1970-1974 124 Special T
 1972-1976 124 Abarth Rally
 1967-1972 125
 1972-1981 132
 1981-1985 Argenta
 1977-1983 131
 1977-1980 131 Abarth
 1982-1988 Ritmo
 1984-1989 Ritmo 105TC, 125TC, 130TC 
 1983-1990 Regata
 1985-1996 Croma
 1988-1995 Tipo
 1990-1999 Tempra
 1994-1997 Coupé

Lancia
 1972-1984 Beta
 1973-1984 Beta Coupé/HPE/Spider
 1975-1982 Beta Montecarlo
 1976-1977 Beta Scorpion
 1982-1983 Rally 037
 1980-1984 Trevi
 1983-1993 Delta
 1988-1993 Delta Integrale
 1982-1989 Prisma
 1984-1994 Thema
 1989-1997 Dedra
 1993-1999 Delta mk2
 1994-1998 Kappa
 1997-1998 Kappa Coupe

Morgan

 1982-1986 Morgan Plus 4

Alfa Romeo

 1988-1991 Alfa Romeo 164 2.0 Turbo 8V
 1992-1997 Alfa Romeo 155 Q4

FSO

 1973-1975 Polski Fiat 125p Monte Carlo
 1973-1977 Polski Fiat 125p Akropolis
 1978-1989 FSO Polonez

One version was the CHT (for "Controlled High Turbulence"). This version was mainly used in the first generation Fiat Croma and used a special head and intake with auxiliary intake ducts to provide a better fuel and gas mixture under low or partial acceleration. This meant considerably improved fuel mileage.

Displacements

Engine Codes

Motorsport
The Fiat Twin Cam engine has been widely used in motorsport and has been the most successful engine in the history of the World Rally Championship. The World Rally Championship for Manufacturers has been won by Fiat and Lancia, using engines based on the Lampredi Twin Cam engine, for a total of 10 years.

The four valve version made its first appearance in the Group 4 competition version of the Fiat 124 Spider Abarth, where it had 1.8 litres. Group 4 regulations at that time allowed the use of a cylinder head of a "free" design. This engine still used a three-piece cylinder head design with an included valve angle of 46 degrees.

In later years motorsport regulations were changed so that the use of four valve heads was only possible when the homologated cars had four valve heads. Therefore, the homologation series of the Fiat 131 Rally Abarth came with a two-litre version of the four valve engine.

These engines were later used in the mid-engined Lancia 037, where they were supercharged and eventually enlarged to 2.1 litres.

In addition to the titles in the World Rally Championship, the Fiat Twin Cam equipped the Lancia Beta Montecarlo turbo, that won the World Sportscar Championship for two consecutive seasons in 1980-1981.

The Fiat Twin Cam has also been used in hot rods and kit cars, with an aftermarket kit to swap one into the Morris Minor.

See also
 Fiat Pratola Serra modular engines

Footnotes

Twin Cam
Straight-four engines
Gasoline engines by model